is a Japanese television drama series starring Japanese idol girl group Nogizaka46. Nanase Nishino played the lead role. It premiered on TV Tokyo on 11 July 2015. The theme song is "Taiyō Nokku".

Cast
 Nanase Nishino as Nanamaru
 Mai Shiraishi as Kirei
 Reika Sakurai as Bunan
 Nanami Hashimoto as Marukyū
 Erika Ikuta as Chopin
 Kazumi Takayama as Kote
 Rina Ikoma as Academy
 Yumi Wakatsuki as Imadoki
 Manatsu Akimoto as Harvard
 Mai Fukagawa as Kāchan
 Sayuri Matsumura as Yūutsu
 Misa Etō as Shelly
 Tezuka Tōru as Kamata
 Kanji Tsuda as Gondawara

References

External links
  
 

Japanese drama television series
2015 in Japanese television
2015 Japanese television series debuts
2015 Japanese television series endings
TV Tokyo original programming
Nogizaka46